Cudahy High School is a public high school which serves Cudahy, Wisconsin, a suburb of Milwaukee in southeastern Milwaukee County, Wisconsin. It is the only high school in the Cudahy School District.

The school athletic teams are known as the Packers, in honor of the meatpacking industry which was once the city's raison d'être.

Notable alumni 
John Dittrich, professional American football player
Lamar Gordon, professional American football player
Lawrence P. Kelly, state legislator from Cudahy
John Navarre, professional American football player

References

External links 
 

Public high schools in Wisconsin
Schools in Milwaukee County, Wisconsin
Public Works Administration in Wisconsin